The Mutant Phase is a Big Finish Productions audio drama based on the long-running British science fiction television series Doctor Who.
It forms the third serial in the Dalek Empire arc, following on from events in The Genocide Machine and The Apocalypse Element. The arc concludes in The Time of the Daleks. This audio drama is based on an earlier Audio Visuals story of the same name.

A director's cut of the first episode was included with the Doctor Who Magazine bonus CD story Cuddlesome.

Plot
The Fifth Doctor and Nyssa discover that even the Daleks have foes that they fear as a paradox threatens to destroy the universe... but are the Daleks the threat or the cure?

Cast
The Doctor — Peter Davison
Nyssa — Sarah Sutton
Professor Ptolem — Christopher Blake
Commander Ganatus — Jared Morgan
Albert — Andrew Ryan
Delores — Sara Wakefield
Dalek Voices — Alistair Lock and Nicholas Briggs
Professor Karl Hendryk — Mark Gatiss

Continuity
This story forms the third serial in the Dalek Empire arc, a storyline that started with the Seventh Doctor (The Genocide Machine) and Sixth Doctor (The Apocalypse Element) and concludes with the Eighth (The Time of the Daleks).  Elements from these stories tie in with the Dalek Empire series.
Some of the action of this story takes place during the Dalek invasion of Earth in the 22nd century, which was originally depicted in the First Doctor serial The Dalek Invasion of Earth. The plan to remove the Earth's core is mentioned, as well as the mine works in Bedfordshire.  The date of this story is given as 2158; the television serial, which has yet to occur, takes place in or around 2164.
The Doctor and Nyssa briefly discuss the fact that this is Nyssa's first encounter with the Daleks, because she never encountered them during any of her appearances in the television series.
Commander Ganatus and the Starship Dyoni are named after the Thal characters from The Daleks''.

External links
Big Finish Productions – The Mutant Phase

Fifth Doctor audio plays
Dalek audio plays
2000 audio plays
Audio plays by Nicholas Briggs
Works set in the 22nd century